Rice High School was a private, Roman Catholic, college preparatory  high school in the Harlem neighborhood of New York City, United States.  It is located within the Roman Catholic Archdiocese of New York. The school closed in 2011 due to financial difficulties.

Background
Rice High School was established in  1938 in Central Harlem by the Congregation of Christian Brothers, who continued to fund the school through much of its existence. Named for Irish missionary and educator Edmund Rice, it was located at 124th Street and Lenox Avenue and was known as a basketball powerhouse producing alumni that included Kemba Walker. The school's basketball team won the CHSAA championship in 1994 with a roster that included Felipe López.

The school was the subject of a 2008 book by Patrick McCloskey, The Street Stops Here: A Year at a Catholic High School in Harlem.

Amid declining enrollment, reduced endowment and increasing operational costs, the school made the decision to close in 2011 after they could not raise the needed funds to move to a cheaper building. It held its final graduation ceremony on May 27, 2011 and vacated the building on June 30 of that same year.

As of August 2021, a group of alumni are working to reopen the school, although there is no clear timeline for this.

Notable alumni and staff

 Shagari Alleyne, basketball player, Class of 2002
 Andre Barrett, basketball player, Class of 2000
 Steve Burtt Jr., basketball player, 2007-08 top scorer in the Israel Basketball Premier League
 Bill Campion, basketball player, Class of 1971
 Keydren Clark, basketball player, Class of 2002
 Chris Fouch, basketball player, Class of 2008
 Tom Gorman, baseball player and umpire, former coach at Rice
 Charles Hamilton, hip hop artist, Class of 2005
 Curtis Kelly, basketball player, Class of 2006
 Bob Lienhard, basketball player, Class of 1966
 Felipe López, basketball player, Class of 1994
 Darryl McDaniels, founding member of the hip hop group Run–D.M.C.
 Dean Meminger, basketball player and coach, Class of 1967
 Russell Robinson, basketball player, Class of 2004
 Kenny Satterfield, basketball player, Class of 1999
 Durand Scott, basketball player, Class of 2009
 Edgar Sosa, basketball player, Class of 2006
 Kemba Walker, basketball player, Class of 2008
 Charlie Yelverton, basketball player, Class of 1967

References

External links

Harlem
Educational institutions established in 1938
Educational institutions disestablished in 2011
Defunct high schools in Manhattan
Congregation of Christian Brothers secondary schools
Defunct boys' schools in the United States
Private high schools in Manhattan
Defunct Catholic secondary schools in New York City
Boys' schools in New York City
1938 establishments in New York City
2011 disestablishments in New York (state)